Kenarporuzh Rural District is in the Central District of Salmas County, West Azerbaijan province, Iran. At the National Census of 2006, its population was 6,175 in 1,303 households. There were 5,653 inhabitants in 1,472 households at the following census of 2011. At the most recent census of 2016, the population of the rural district was 5,045 in 1,431 households. The largest of its 15 villages was Tamar, with 860 people.

References 

Salmas County

Rural Districts of West Azerbaijan Province

Populated places in West Azerbaijan Province

Populated places in Salmas County